The 2017 J3 League (referred to as the 2017 Meiji Yasuda J3 League (2017 明治安田生命J3リーグ) for sponsorship reasons) was the 4th season of the J3 League under its current name. The fixtures were announced on 26 January 2017. The 2017 season started on 11 March, then ended on 3 December.

Blaublitz Akita won their first title as a J.League club.

Clubs

A total of 17 teams took part in the league. 2016 J3 League champion Oita Trinita gained promotion to the J2 League, and was replaced by Giravanz Kitakyushu, that finished last in the 2016 J2 League. Oita made an immediate return to the J2 League after being relegated in 2015. Kitakyushu competed in the third tier for the first time under the J3 League name. Azul Claro Numazu made their debut in the third tier as a club.

Personnel and kits

Results

League table

Results table

Season statistics

Top scorers
.

Attendances

References

J3 League seasons
3
J3